Jacques Boulanger (26 April 1927 – 4 August 1956) was a French athlete. He competed in the men's triple jump at the 1952 Summer Olympics.

References

1927 births
1956 deaths
Athletes (track and field) at the 1952 Summer Olympics
French male triple jumpers
Olympic athletes of France
Place of birth missing